Kraina Mriy (founded in 2004) is a biannual, multi-day festival of ethnically Ukrainian music. It was founded by Ukrainian musician Oleg Skrypka. The first festival was held at the Spivoche Pole (Singing Field) in Kyiv. The summer festival coincides with Midsummer, and the winter festival is celebrated on Orthodox Christmas (6 January).

The festival includes musical performances on the main stage, a craft fair, book fairs, folk crafts workshops, folk art exhibitions, authentic master classes and ethnic cuisine.

The purpose of the festival 
Kraina Mriy aims to showcase the best of Ukrainian national and world music, crafts, parades, embroidery, cuisine, the Monholf'yeriya hot air balloon festival, and other original activities.

History 
Since 2004, Krayina Mriy has had about 1 million attendees. In addition to the traditional location of Kyiv, it has also been held in Lviv, London, Surgut, and Perm. The festival season has two formats; summer and winter. In winter 2017, it was held in two cities: Kyiv, at Spivoche Pole, on January 7; and in Dnipro, 7–8 January, at Heroes' Square Maidan.

During the festival's history, it has been attended by performers, artists, and guests from over 30 countries.

Participants 
 2004 – Oleg Skrypka, DakhaBrakha, Nina Matviyenko, Čankišou (Czech Republic), Enver Izmailov, Zdob și Zdub (Moldova), Mandry, Palats (Belarus), Ishbel MacAskill (Scotland), Spontaani Vire (Finland), Intakas (Lithuania), Kapela Drewutnia (Poland), Karpathians, Drevo, Bozhychi, Buttya, Z Drogi (Poland)
 2005 - Vopli Vidopliassova, Red Cardell (France), Sevara Nazarkhan (Uzbekistan), Tartak and Huljajhorod, Haydamaky, Ocheretyanyi Kit, Hutsul Calypso, Roman Hrynkiv, Mandry, UR'IYA (Belarus) Rzepczyno (Poland) Esztenas (Hungary)
 2006 - Ivo Papasov (Bulgaria), Red Cardell (France), Baba Zula (Turkey), Oleg Skrypka, Vilddas (Finland), Romano Drom (Hungary), Cliff Stapleton (United Kingdom), Jonathan Shorlend (United Kingdom), Stelsi, Hutsul Calipso, Jammu (Iran) Mtiebi (Georgia), Tree, Buttya, Huljajhorod
 2007 - Khaled (France), Natasha Atlas (United Kingdom), Värttinä (Finland), Esma Redžepova (Macedonia), Anselmo Crew (Hungary), Oleg Skrypka, DakhaBrakha, Trinity (Belarus), Roman Hrynkiv, DrymbaDaDzyga, BandUrBrend, Volodar, Tree, Buttya, Soncekliosh, Kompanichenko Taras, Bourdon, Eduard Drach
 2008 - Gipsy (Czech Republic), Kubasonics (Canada), Kal (Serbia), Karavan Familia (Hungary), Oleg Skrypka, TaRuta, chorea Cossack, No way back there, Mikhailov miracle, Kompanichenko Taras, Stary Olsa (Belarus)
 2009 - Valkyrien Allstars (Norway), Zalvarinis (Lithuania), Fanfara Shavale (Romania), Mad Heads, Kompanichenko Taras, chorea Cossack, Mikhailov miracle, Tree 
 2010 - Joanna Slowinska (Poland), Oleg Skrypka, Foma, Testamentum Terrae (Belarus) Kompanichenko Taras, chorea Cossck, Ildi (Latvia), Mikhailov miracle, Jambibum (Belarus), Vasya Club 
 2011 - Sari Kaasinen (Finland), Baba Zula (Turkey), Osimira (Belarus), Quo Vadis, Yat-Kha (Republic of Tuva), Tartak, Hazmat Modine (United States), De Temps Antan (Canada), Oleg Skrypka 
 2012 - Vopli Vidopliassova, Vasyl Popadiuk, Mgzavrebi (Georgia), TNMK, Namgar (Buryatia), Lilian Vieira (Brazil, United Kingdom), Baba Zula (Turkey), ILLARIA, Roman Hrynkiv, Astarta, MA VALISE (France)
 2013 - Papa Duke Band & Oleg Skrypka (Ukraine - Canada), Trebunie Tutki (Poland), Fatima Spar (Austria), SunSay & Elvira Sarykhalil, DrymbaDaDzyga, Kozak System, Palats (Belarus) 
 2014 - Oleg Skrypka and Jazz Cabaret "Zabava", BoomBox and Roman Hrynkiv, Silver Wedding (Belarus), Perkalaba, The Vieux, Trystavisim, Toumast (Niger) Kissmet (India), Earth Wheel Sky Band (Serbia), "Miazsz" (Poland)
 2015 - Vopli Vidopliassova, BoomBox, ONUKA, Orest Luty, TNMK, Serhiy Zhadan and Sobaky v Kosmosi, Atmasfera, Pikkardiyska Tertsiya, Motor'rolla, The Doox, NastyaZnykaye, Rock-H
 2016 - Vopli Vidopliassova, DakhaBrakha, Astarte, Perkalaba, The Doox, Rock-H, Joryj Kłoc.
 2017 - Oleg Skrypka and Le Grand Orchestra, TNMK, Dilya, Joryj Kłoc, ILLARIA, "VERTEP", KoraLLi, Tsarina.

Music festivals in Ukraine
Summer events in Ukraine